The 1989 NCAA Division I softball season, play of college softball in the United States organized by the National Collegiate Athletic Association (NCAA) at the Division I level, began in February 1989.  The season progressed through the regular season, many conference tournaments and championship series, and concluded with the 1989 NCAA Division I softball tournament and 1989 Women's College World Series.  The Women's College World Series, consisting of the eight remaining teams in the NCAA Tournament and held in Sunnyvale, California at Twin Creeks Sports Complex, ended on May 28, 1989.

Conference standings

Women's College World Series
The 1989 NCAA Women's College World Series took place from May 24 to May 28, 1989 in Sunnyvale, California.

Season leaders
Batting
Batting average: .477 – Jocelyn Kondrotas, Maine Black Bears
RBIs: 56 – Nicki Dennis, Arizona Wildcats
Home runs: 9 – Julie Sherman, UConn Huskies

Pitching
Wins: 42-13 – Katie Wiese, Oregon Ducks
ERA: 0.24 (5 ER/146.0 IP) – Tiffany Boyd, UCLA Bruins
Strikeouts: 256 – Lisa Kemme, Winthrop Eagles

Records
Freshman class innings pitched:
393.0 – Dana Mitchell, Texas A&M Aggies

Senior class at bats:
255 – Kathy Mayer, Fresno State Bulldogs

Awards
Honda Sports Award Softball:
Janice Parks, UCLA Bruins

All America Teams
The following players were members of the All-American Teams.

First Team

Second Team

References